Tranmere Rovers Football Club is an English association football club based in Birkenhead, Wirral. Founded in 1884, they played their first games under the name Belmont F.C.; in 1885, before the start of their second season, they adopted the name Tranmere Rovers. In 1889, Tranmere entered the West Lancashire League, and progressed through the Combination, the Lancashire Combination and the Central League. On 27 August 1921, as founder members of Division Three North, they won their first Football League match 4–1 against Crewe Alexandra at Prenton Park. Tranmere have played in the Football League ever since, with the exception of 1939–1946, when competitive football was suspended due to the Second World War. Their highest league finish was fourth in the First Division which, at the time, was the second tier of the league pyramid, in the 1992–93 season.

Harold Bell made a record 595 league appearances for Tranmere. Bell also holds the record for the most consecutive league appearances for a British team; he was picked for the first game after the Second World War in the 1946–47 season and did not miss a match until 30 August 1955, a total of 401 consecutive matches in the Third Division North. Ian Muir's tally of 142 goals in 314 league appearances makes him Tranmere's leading scorer.

Players 
This list contains players who have appeared in domestic league competition for Tranmere since the Second World War. It includes first-team appearances and goals in the Football League and play-offs. Appearances and goals in other competitions or non-competitive matches are not included. Statistics from the two games against Accrington Stanley in 1961–62, prior to Accrington's resignation from the Football League, have been expunged from the records and are not included. Statistics for current players are correct to the start of the 2012–13 season.

Notes

References 

 General

  .

 

 

 

 

 Specific

 
Tranmere Rovers
Association football player non-biographical articles